Lake in the Sky is an artificial lake in Blount County, Tennessee, formed by damming Flat Creek. It lies in the center of Top of the World, an unincorporated community.

Location
Lake in the Sky is a small mountain lake located on the slopes of Chilhowee Mountain. Foothills Parkway passes just to the northwest, and the boundary of the Great Smoky Mountains National Park lies just to the southeast. The lake lies in an area called The Flats, on a spur of Chilhowee Mountain. The surrounding country is rugged. The nearest major town is Townsend, Tennessee.

Lake
The lake is part of the watershed of the Little River. It is near the head of Flat Creek, a tributary of Hesse Creek. The Flat Creek dam is at the north end of the lake. The dam was built in 1966, forming the  lake. Flat Creek is non-navigable.

Lake of the Sky is not operated for flood control purposes, but it is one of several dams in Blount County that may provide some protection against flooding.

Specimens of the freshwater jellyfish Craspedacusta sowerbii, an exotic species that is widespread in the United States, have been found in the lake. Downstream of Lake in the Sky, Flat Creek had elevated iron concentrations in fall and summer of 2003. This is a concern since the creek is a direct tributary to a stocked trout stream.

Settlement

Juan Pardo may have visited the future site of the lake during his 1567–68 expedition. He found a small reddish stone, which was examined by Andrés Suarez, a "melter of gold and silver". Suarez considered that it contained silver.

The lake today is surrounded by a small community at  named the Top of the World Estates. The Blount County Fire Protection District has its station #8 at 5714 Flats Road, on the east shore of the lake.

References
Notes

Citations

Sources

Reservoirs in Tennessee
Bodies of water of Blount County, Tennessee
1966 establishments in Tennessee
Dams completed in 1966